This is a list of members of the Victorian Legislative Council between 1958 and 1961. As half of the Legislative Council's terms expired at each triennial election, half of these members were elected at the 1955 triennial election with terms expiring in 1961, while the other half were elected at the 1958 triennial election with terms expiring in 1964.

 On 2 June 1960, Fred Thomas, Labor MLC for Melbourne Province, died. Labor candidate Doug Elliot won the resulting by-election on 6 August 1960.
 On 18 June 1960, Bill Slater, Labor MLC for Doutta Galla Province, died. Labor candidate John Tripovich won the resulting by-election on 6 August 1960.

Sources
 Re-member (a database of all Victorian MPs since 1851). Parliament of Victoria.
 Victorian Year Book 1954–58

Members of the Parliament of Victoria by term
20th-century Australian politicians